George Sotiros Pappas (born 1942) is a professor of philosophy at Ohio State University.  Pappas specializes in epistemology, the history of early modern philosophy, philosophy of religion and metaphysics. He is of Greek and English origin.

He is the author of the Stanford Encyclopedia of Philosophy entry on "Internalist versus Externalist" conceptions of epistemic justification.

He was co-editor (with Marshall Swain) of Essays on Knowledge and Justification (1978), regarded as a key anthology of essays relating to the Gettier problem and used as a core text in undergraduate epistemology courses.

Pappas is an editorial consultant of Berkeley Studies.

Studies in Berkeley's philosophy 
Pappas is known to be a leading Berkeley scholar; his essay "Berkeley and Scepticism" was in 1993 awarded the International Berkeley Prize. Pappas is a regular participant of International Berkeley Conferences. At one such conference, celebrating the 300th anniversary of George Berkeley's birth, Pappas propounded a new approach to the relationship between Berkeley's anti-abstractionism and "esse est percipi" principle. On Pappas' reading, Berkeley's two theses — that there are no abstract ideas and that sensible objects must be perceived in order to exist — entail one another.

Pappas' interpretation of Berkeley's esse is percipi thesis has sparked much discussion. In 1989, the Garland Publishing Company brought out a 15-volume collection of major works on Berkeley; Pappas' paper "Abstract ideas and the 'esse is percipi' thesis" was included in the third volume, as it was considered to be a significant contribution to Berkeley scholarship.

Pappas developed his treatment of Berkeley's "esse est percipi" principle to repudiate the "inherence interpretation of Berkeley", upon which Edwin E. Allaire, among others, elaborated.

That account is put forward to answer an extremely perplexing question in the history of philosophy: Why did Berkeley embrace idealism, i. e., why did he hold that esse est percipi, that to be is to be perceived? 

After emerging in the early 1960s, the "inherence account" attracted numerous proponents and became an influential element of contemporary Berkeley scholarship. In his paper "Ideas, minds, and Berkeley" Pappas revealed some discrepancies between fountain-head evidences and Allaire's approach to a reconstruction of Berkeley's idealism. Pappas' critical examination of the "inherence account" is greatly appreciated by Berkeley scholars. Pappas' penetrating remarks compelled Edwin B. Allaire  to revise and improve his conception. Even those who share Allaire's account of Berkeley's idealism acknowledge Pappas' article to be "an excellent review and critique of the IA [inherence account]."

In 2000, Pappas published his monograph Berkeley's thought in which some parts were based on earlier papers of his. While writings by A. A. Luce or Geoffrey Warnock are long outdated, Berkeley's thought is often included in lists of recommended literature on Berkeley's philosophy.

Publications

See also
 American philosophy
 List of American philosophers

References

1942 births
American philosophers
Epistemologists
Living people
Ohio State University faculty
George Berkeley scholars